The Jackson's Sawmill Covered Bridge or Eichelberger's Covered Bridge is a covered bridge that spans the West Branch of the Octoraro Creek in Lancaster County, Pennsylvania.  A county-owned and maintained bridge, its official designation is the West Octoraro #1 Bridge.  The bridge is purportedly the only covered bridge in the county that is not built perpendicular to the stream it crosses due to the placement of the sawmill on one side of the bridge and the rock formations faced by the builders on the other side.

The bridge has a single span, wooden, double Burr arch trusses design with the addition of steel hanger rods. The deck is made from oak planks. It is painted red, the traditional color of Lancaster County covered bridges, on both the inside and outside. Both approaches to the bridge are painted in the traditional white color.

The bridge's WGCB Number is 38-36-33. In 1980 it was added to the National Register of Historic Places as structure number 80003520, but it was removed from the Register in 1986. It is located at  (39.89700, -76.08000). Due to its remote location in an isolated part of the county, it is seen less than many of the county's other covered bridges that are closer to the major populations centers such as Lancaster.

History 
The bridge was built in 1878 by John Smith and Samuel Stauffer at a cost of $2,410. In 1985 it was washed mostly intact from its foundations and deposited a short distance downstream in a flood. It was repaired and reset at a cost to the county of $75,000. During the rebuilding, the bridge was raised  to protect it against future flooding. As of summer 2006, the bridge was in good conditions, having undergone a recent rehabilitation in May 2005.

Dimensions 
Length:  span and  total length
Width:  clear deck and  total width
Overhead clearance: 
Underclearance:

Gallery

See also
Burr arch truss
List of Lancaster County covered bridges

References 

Covered bridges on the National Register of Historic Places in Pennsylvania
Covered bridges in Lancaster County, Pennsylvania
Bridges completed in 1878
Former National Register of Historic Places in Pennsylvania
National Register of Historic Places in Lancaster County, Pennsylvania
Road bridges on the National Register of Historic Places in Pennsylvania
Wooden bridges in Pennsylvania
Burr Truss bridges in the United States